Rogeria may refer to:

920 Rogeria, an asteroid
Rogeria (ant), a genus of insects in the family Formicidae
Rogeria (plant), a genus of plants in the family Pedaliaceae